Davide Formolo (born 25 October 1992) is an Italian professional road racing cyclist, who currently rides for UCI WorldTeam . Formolo turned professional in 2014.

Biography
Born on 25 October 1992, in Negrar, Italy, Formolo resides in Marano di Valpolicella, Veneto, Italy.

On 12 May 2015, at the Giro d'Italia, Formolo escaped with twenty riders, and successfully soloed, to the finish. He finished twenty-two seconds ahead of the peloton. He was named in the startlist for the 2016 Vuelta a España.

In August 2020, he was named in the startlist for the 2020 Tour de France. He withdrew from the race following stage 10, after he was diagnosed with a fractured collarbone following a crash.

Major results

2012
 2nd Road race, National Under-23 Road Championships
 2nd Gran Premio Palio del Recioto
 4th Overall Giro della Valle d'Aosta
 8th Overall Girobio
2013
 2nd Overall Giro della Valle d'Aosta
 2nd Trofeo Matteotti Under-23
 3rd Coppa della Pace
 4th Road race, National Under-23 Road Championships
 6th Overall Tour de l'Avenir
 6th GP Capodarco
 8th Gran Premio Palio del Recioto
 9th Trofeo Edil C
 10th Gran Premio di Poggiana
2014
 2nd Road race, National Road Championships
 2nd GP Industria & Artigianato di Larciano
 4th Overall Tour of Turkey
 6th Giro dell'Emilia
 7th Overall Tour de Taiwan
 7th Overall Tour de Suisse
 7th Japan Cup
 9th Gran Premio di Lugano
2015
 1st Stage 4 Giro d'Italia
 1st  Young rider classification, Volta ao Algarve
 3rd Trofeo Andratx-Mirador d'Es Colomer
 9th Overall Tour de Pologne
 9th Overall Tour of Alberta
2016
 4th Overall Tour de Pologne
 9th Overall Vuelta a España
2017
 10th Overall Giro d'Italia
2018
 6th Overall Abu Dhabi Tour
 7th Overall Tirreno–Adriatico
 7th Liège–Bastogne–Liège
 8th Overall Tour de Pologne
 10th Overall Giro d'Italia
2019
 1st  Road race, National Road Championships
 1st Stage 7 Volta a Catalunya
 2nd Liège–Bastogne–Liège
 2nd Tokyo 2020 Test Event
 7th Overall Tour de Pologne
2020
 1st Stage 3 Critérium du Dauphiné
 2nd Strade Bianche
 8th Overall UAE Tour
2021
 2nd Tre Valli Varesine
 10th Overall Tour de Luxembourg
2022
 2nd Veneto Classic
 4th Coppa Agostoni
 9th Giro dell'Emilia
 10th Overall Deutschland Tour
2023
 2nd Overall Saudi Tour
 9th Strade Bianche

Grand Tour general classification results timeline

References

External links

 
 
 
 
 

1992 births
Living people
Italian male cyclists
Italian Giro d'Italia stage winners
Cyclists from the Province of Verona